This article lists notable faculty (past and present) of the University of California, Santa Barbara.

Nobel laureates

Current faculty 
 David Gross, Nobel Prize recipient, Physics, 2004
 Alan Heeger, Nobel Prize recipient, Chemistry, 2000
 Walter Kohn, Nobel Prize recipient, Chemistry, 1998
 Herbert Kroemer, Nobel Prize recipient, Physics, 2000
 Finn Kydland, Nobel Prize recipient, Economics, 2004
 Shuji Nakamura, Nobel Prize recipient, Physics, 2014

Former faculty 
 Edward C. Prescott, Nobel Prize recipient, Economics, 2004
 John Robert Schrieffer, Nobel Prize recipient, Physics, 1972
 Frank Wilczek, Nobel Prize recipient, Physics, 2004

Pulitzer Prize 
 Fredrik Logevall, Pulitzer Prize for History recipient, 2013
 N. Scott Momaday, Pulitzer Prize for Fiction recipient, 1969
 Jeffrey C. Stewart, Pulitzer Prize for Non-Fiction recipient, 2019

Anthropology 
James F. Brooks, historian, Native Americans
Napoleon Chagnon, pioneer of biologically based interpretation of human reproductive and aggressive behavior
Brian Fagan
Garrett Hardin, Professor of Human Ecology from 1963 until his (nominal) retirement in 1978; most known for his papers "The Tragedy of the Commons" and "Lifeboat Ethics: the Case Against Helping the Poor"
Stuart Tyson Smith, best known for his reconstruction of the ancient Egyptian language for the films Stargate and The Mummy
John Tooby, pioneer of evolutionary psychology

Art 
Ann Bermingham, art historian
Henri Dorra, art historian
Kip Fulbeck
Gary Hugh Brown, Professor Emeritus of Art at UCSB (1966-2006)

Botany 
Katherine Esau

Chemical engineering 
Jacob Israelachvili

Chemistry and biochemistry 
Thomas C. Bruice, coined the term "bio-organic chemistry", member of National Academy of Science
Craig Hawker
Bruce H. Lipshutz, professor, made significant contributions to copper catalyzed organic reactions
Ralph G. Pearson, Emeritus, coined the concepts of "hard" and "soft" for acids and bases
Galen D. Stucky, early researcher in the field of materials chemistry

Chicano studies 
Luis Leal
Horacio Roque Ramírez

Computer science 
Tao Yang

Counseling, clinical, and school psychology 
Shane R. Jimerson, 2003 co-recipient of the Lightner Witmer Award from the American Psychological Association; noted for his work in school psychology and traumatic stress
Tania Israel expert in LGBTQ intervention research and dialogue across political disagreement

East Asian languages and cultural studies 
John Nathan

Ecology, evolution, and marine biology 
 Benjamin Halpern – marine biologist, ecologist, and 2016 A.G. Huntsman Award for Excellence in the Marine Sciences winner
William W. Murdoch, population ecologist known for his research in population regulation and predator-prey relationships

Electrical and computer engineering 
Lawrence Rabiner
Petar V. Kokotovic

English 
Hugh Kenner, literary critic
Shirley Geok-lin Lim, poet and literary scholar
Marvin Mudrick, literary scholar

Feminist studies 
Leila Rupp
Jacqueline Bobo
Tania Israel expert in LGBTQ intervention research and dialogue across political disagreement

Film and media studies 
Dick Hebdige

Geography 
Reginald Golledge, pioneer in behavioral geography
Michael Frank Goodchild, most known for work on GIS, or computer mapping
David Lopez-Carr
Waldo R. Tobler, known for his first law of geography

Geology 
Tanya Atwater, instrumental in the development of the theory of plate tectonics
Stanley Awramik
Richard Virgil Fisher, volcanologist
George R Tilton, pioneer in the measurement and application of isotopes to geology

Germanic, Slavic, and Semitic studies 
Laurence Rickels

Global and international studies 
Alison Brysk, Mellichamp Chair in Global Governance
Mark Juergensmeyer
Paul Orfalea, founder of the copy-chain Kinko's

History 
James F. Brooks, Professor of History and Anthropology, Native American history
Alexander DeConde, Professor Emeritus of History, US diplomatic history
Dimitrije Đorđević, late Professor of History, Modern Balkan History
Mary O. Furner, Professor of History, 20th century US 
Tsuyoshi Hasegawa, Professor of History, Russian and Soviet history
C. Warren Hollister, late Professor of History, Medieval Europe
Immanuel C. Y. Hsu, late Professor of Chinese history
Wilbur Jacobs, late Professor of History, Native American and Frontier History
Nelson Lichtenstein, Professor of History, US Labor
Albert Lindemann, Professor Emeritus of History, Modern European history
Harold Marcuse, Associate Professor, Modern European history 
Joachim Remak, late Professor of History, Modern European History
W. Patrick McCray, Professor of History, History of Science
David Rock, Professor Emeritus of History, Latin American history
Jeffrey Burton Russell, Professor Emeritus of History, Medieval European history
Paul Spickard, Professor of History, 20th-century US, world, and ethnic history
Jeffrey C. Stewart an American Professor of Black Studies

Linguistics 
Mary Bucholtz
Wallace Chafe
Bernard Comrie
Stefan Th. Gries
Marianne Mithun
Sandra A. Thompson

Materials 
Arthur Gossard
Shuji Nakamura

Mathematics 
Michael G. Crandall, winner of the Leroy P. Steele Prize for Seminal Contribution to Research
Glen Culler, early innovator in the development of the interactive computing and ARPAnet
Yitang Zhang

Mechanical engineering 
Henry T. Yang, Chancellor

Media arts and technology 
Curtis Roads

Molecular and cellular biology 
 Jamey Marth, molecular and cellular biologist, Director of the Center for Nanomedicine, professor in the Department of Molecular, Cellular and Developmental Biology

Music 
Julia Banzi, Ph.D. Ethnomusicology, member of the Al-Andalus Ensemble, expert on Andalusian music and women's ensembles of the Arab world
John Dearman, Grammy Award-winning classical guitarist, member of the Los Angeles Guitar Quartet (LAGQ), Director of Guitar Studies
Alejandro Planchart, Emeritus, professor of musicology, expert on Guillaume Dufay

Philosophy 
C. Anthony Anderson
Nathan Salmon

Physics 
David Awschalom, best known for his work in spintronics in semiconductors
James Hartle, together with Stephen Hawking, proposed the Hartle-Hawking wavefunction of the universe, a specific solution to the Wheeler-deWitt equation meant to explain the initial conditions of the Big Bang cosmology
James S. Langer
Joseph Polchinski

Political science 
M. Kent Jennings, one of the founding fathers of political socialization research and theory.
Benjamin Cohen, leading scholar in the field of international political economy
Leah Stokes, political scientist specializing in environmental policy

Psychological and brain sciences 
Daphne Bugental, psychologist known for her research on parent-child relationships, infant and child maltreatment, and family violence
Leda Cosmides, helped pioneer the field of evolutionary psychology
Michael Gazzaniga, pioneer of cognitive neuroscience

Religious studies 
Walter Capps
J. Gordon Melton
Birger A. Pearson
Ann Taves

Sociology 
Donald Cressey
John Foran
Ralph Larkin
William I. Robinson
France Winddance Twine
Howard Winant

See also 
 List of University of California, Santa Barbara alumni

References 

 
Santa Barbara faculty